The Maldives requires its residents to register their motor vehicles and display vehicle registration plates.

Maldivian license plates always had white font on a black base. Until 1984, they showed a number with up to four digits.

In 1984 an additional graphic was placed behind the number and in 1998 letters were added to the numbers.

The current system was introduced in 2003.

System

References

External links
 
 License plates of the Maldives at Francoplaque
 License plates of the Maldives at Worldlicenseplates

Maldives
Transport in the Maldives
Maldives transport-related lists